Mazari (Balochi and ) is a Baloch tribe in Pakistan. Mazari is derived from the Balochi word mazar, which means "Tiger" in the Balochi language. Rojhan-Mazari, a town in the Rajanpur District of the Punjab near the inter-provincial borders of Balochistan, Sindh and Punjab, is the stronghold of the Mazari tribe.

History

The Mazari tribe is one of the oldest tribes of the Baloch.
The area the Mazaris conquered is still known as Tuman Mazari. It encompassed an area that included most of Kashmore District in Sindh, Tehsil Sadiqabad, Chatha Baksha Mazari District, Jhang and all of Tehsil Rojhan in Punjab. The arrival of the British saw the golden era for the Mazari tribe. The Chief ruled an area from the town of Bhong all the way to the Sulaiman Mountain Range and from Kashmore to Giamul. This is estimated to be an area of at least 8,000 km sq. The Mazaris continuously defeated, overwhelmed and annihilated the Nahars, Machis, Bugtis and Chandios and fought many battles against the Sikhs of Punjab who were the dominant power before the arrival of the British.

Wars with the Sikh Empire

In 1836, Mithankot, by then a strong Sikh garrison fortress, was attacked by the Mazari Baloch tribal forces under the command of Sardar Karam Khan, the younger brother of the Mazari Chief, Sardar Mir Bahram Khan. The attack came as result of the constant threats of Maharaja Kharak Singh to Rojhan Mazari. The garrison was burnt to the ground. Any prisoners captured were skinned alive. Maharaja Ranjit Singh retaliated by sending Diwan Sawan Mal Chopra, his governor of Multan, to attack Rojhan. Rojhan was burnt. Despite this, casualties on the Mazari side were minimal as the Sikh Army lost the element of surprise and the Mazaris were able to evacuate their city in time. They, then took refuge in the Sulaiman Mountains and continued to harass the Sikhs from there. This resulted in constant skirmishes between both the parties. According to book 'Tehreek e Mujahideen', after hearing about the bravery of Mazaris, Syed Ahmad Barelvi of Tehreek-e-Mujahidin, approached Sardar Karam Khan, at Kin and offered an alliance to fight jointly against Sikhs and destroy the Kafir kingdom of Lahore but Sardar Karam Khan refused to accept the offer, after having consultation with his elder brother, Mir Fasih Khan. Afterwards, Diwan Sawan Mal Chopra invited Sardar Karam Khan to Multan where they entered to a mutual agreement which was to be ratified at Lahore.

Finally, in 1838 Mir Bahram Khan visited Lahore with 12,000 Mazari tribesmen and officials on the invitation of the Maharaja Ranjit Singh. The Mazaris were well received by the Maharaja at the Lahore Fort and given a royal welcome. The Maharaja had the Mughal-era Naulakha Pavilion (Saman Burj) inside the Lahore Fort specially renovated for the month-long stay of Sardar Mir Bahram Khan Mazari. This meeting between the two leaders officially brought an end to the long war between the Mazari Baloch and the Sikh Empire that started with the attack on Mithankot. This picture of Mir Bahram Khan Mazari is in the Sikh War Gallery in Amritsar, India, and was painted by the personal French artist of Maharaja Ranjit Singh's court when Mir Bahram Khan Mazari visited Lahore.

Geography
The area held by the tribe can be categorized as arid and as well as fertile. To the west of Rojhan-Mazari lie the Sulaiman Range and to the east flows the River Indus. Rainfall is scarce but heavy showers do occur 3-4 times every year which lead to hill torrents from the west. The climate is excellent for crops like cotton, wheat, rice, sugar cane etc. to grow.

Language
The language which the Mazari tribe speaks is known as Sulimanki Balochi which is widely spoken in Rojhan Mazari, Kashmor and in other parts of Balochistan as well. Balochi language is also widely understood in the Rojhan Mazari. Mazaris in Sindh speak Sindhi as well.

Sir Nawab Imam Buksh Khan Mazari
His Noble Majesty, Sir Nawab Mir Imam Buksh Khan Mazari was the second son of Mir Bahram Khan Mazari. Mir Dost Ali Khan, his elder brother, was the initial chieftain of the tribe but as he fell to dissipated habits, his  younger more  energetic brother, Imam Buksh Khan took charge of the tribe.

The Panjab Chiefs
Lepel Griffin's book mentions Sir Nawab Imam Buksh Khan Mazari and his son Nawab Mir Bahram khan Mazari:

Khan Bahadur Sardar Rahim Yar Khan Mazari

Rahim Yar Khan was the eldest son of Sardar Ali Akbar Khan Mazari and the grandson of Mir Bahram Khan. The British gave him the title of Khan Bahadur because of his tireless efforts in the service of the Empire. He was made the interim Tumandar/Chief of the tribe when Mir Murad Bukhsh Khan died and his son, Mir Balakh Sher Mazari, was still a minor.

Mention in Northern India's Who's Who
The book describes him in the following words;

Mir Balakh Sher Mazari
Mir Balakh Sher Mazari is the Chieftain (Tumandar) and the Paramount Sardar of the Mazari tribe. As the Chief of Mazaris he holds the title of Mir and also goes by the styles of Tumandar and Sardar.  Mir Balakh Sher Mazari is the twenty-second Sardar and the seventh Mir of Mazaris. The eldest of three brothers, he has one surviving brother Sherbaz Khan Mazari who has played a prominent role in Pakistan politics. He himself is a former caretaker Prime Minister of Pakistan and has been elected to the National Assembly numerous times. He was born on 8 July 1928 to Mir Murad Buksh Khan Mazari, the twenty-first Sardar and the Sixth Mir of Mazaris. Initially Khan Bahadur Sardar Rahimyar Khan Mazari was made the care taker chieftain of the tribe as Mir Sahib, as he respectfully known as, was still a minor. Upon reaching age though, Mir Balakh Sher was formally acknowledged as the Chief, by the British government and tribal elders as well. His father, Mir Murad Buksh Khan Mazari had earlier succeeded his elder brother Mir Dost Muhammad Khan Mazari as the Chief. They were the sons of Mir Sher Muhammad Khan Mazari, the Nineteenth Sardar and Fourth Mir of Mazaris. Balakh Sher Mazari, after the completion of his education from Aitchison College in 1945 went on to live in Rojhan-Mazari, from where he joined active politics in 1951. He went on to enjoy a fruitful career in politics, which spanned over five decades, before eventually retiring and passing on his political legacy to his grandsons, Dost Muhammad Mazari and Sher Muhammad Mazari. He is still active in his tribal responsibilities and enjoys immense support from the entire Mazari tribe to this day.

Sardar Sherbaz Khan
Sherbaz Khan Mazari is the youngest son of Mir Murad Baksh Khan. He was born in Rojhan in 1930 and was educated in the Royal Indian Military College in Dehra doon. In Aitchison College, Sardar Sherbaz Khan Mazari entered politics by supporting Fatima Jinnah, sister of Mohammad Ali Jinnah, against Ayub Khan in the Presidential elections of 1964. In 1970, he was elected to the National Assembly as an independent candidate . He was a signatory to the 1973 Constitution, as head of the independent group in the Assembly. After the Bhutto-led army action in Balochistan and the subsequent banning of the National Awami Party, he formed the National Democratic Party. This was part of an effort to oppose Zulfiqar Ali Bhutto's autocratic rule as well as to bring about peace in Balochistan. He served as the leader of the NDP from 1975 to 1985 and the leader of the Opposition in Parliament from 1975-1977. A former friend of Zulfiqar Ali Bhutto, he became one of his main political opponents in the Pakistan National Alliance. The 1977 elections led to a civil agitation movement which ultimately ousted Zulfiqar Ali Bhutto's government and brought in Martial Law under General Zia.

During General Zia's regime he again played a key role in opposing the military regime. He helped establish Movement for the Restoration of Democracy (MRD), an alliance of opposition parties which included the Pakistan Peoples Party. He spearheaded a movement against the military government as the Chairman of MRD's "Pakistan Bachao "(Save Pakistan )Committee. The resulting agitation caused widespread commercial disruption in Sindh and parts of Punjab and but was brutally suppressed by the army at a cost of many lives. It was only after Zia's death did democracy finally return to Pakistan.
A strong believer of democracy Sardar Mazari was incarcerated on numerous occasions during both Zulfikar ali Bhutto and General Zia's rule. He was one of the few West Pakistani politicians to have opposed the army action in what was then East Pakistan against the Bengali's and the only opponent of Zulfikar Bhutto to have condemned his judicial murder. He was offered key political positions by Zulfikar Bhutto, Zia Ul Haq and later Benazir Bhutto but declined each one of them He has been an outspoken critic of the treatment meted out to Balochi separatists by the Central Government

He was defeated in the 1988 general elections due to differences within the Mazari tribe apparently engineered by "the Establishment" and retired from politics greatly disillusioned. In 1999, he wrote his memoir, A Journey to Disillusionment.

Main clans
The Mazari tribe consists of 4 large sub-clans and 60 small sub-tribes. The Mazari Chief family belongs to the Balachani clan. Other clans include 
 Selatani
 Dolani
 Grani
 Sodvani
 Sargani
 Sohreja
 Gadhi
 Lolai 
 Esiani 
 Pyomaar 
 Rustamani 
 Lathani 
 Gulrani
 Harwani

See also
 Shaukat Hussein Mazari
 Abdul Rashid Ghazi

References

 Popular Poetry of the Balochis by Mansel Longworth Dames
 
 34 Baloch regiment Col. Sardar Allah Yar Khan Mazari
 The Punjab Chiefs Vol-i : by Griffin Sir Lepel H.

Baloch tribes
Baloch people